Convention Girl, also known as Atlantic City Romance, is a 1935 American comedy film starring Rose Hobart and featuring Shemp Howard of the Three Stooges.  The film was directed by Luther Reed.

Plot

Cast
Rose Hobart as Cynthia "Babe" Laval
Weldon Heyburn as Bill Bradley
Herbert Rawlinson as Ward Hollister
Toni Reed as Tommy Laval
Shemp Howard as Dan Higgins
Ruth Gillette as Helen Shalton
James Spottswood as John "Cupid" Pettyjohn
Sally O'Neil as Gracie
Lucille Mendez as Peg
Nancy Kelly as Betty
Alan Brooks as Ernest
William H. White as Penrod
Nell O'Day as Daisy Miller
Laliva Browne as Mrs. Pettyjohn
Isham Jones as Himself

References

External links

1935 films
1935 comedy films
American black-and-white films
American comedy films
Films set in Atlantic City, New Jersey
Films shot in Atlantic City, New Jersey
1935 drama films
Films directed by Luther Reed
1930s English-language films
1930s American films